This is a list of tennis players who have represented the Great Britain Fed Cup team in an official Fed Cup match. Great Britain have taken part in the competition since 1963.

Players
Bold represents in the current team for the most recent tie, 2019 Fed Cup Europe/Africa Zone Group I Play-offs. Last updated after the 2019 Fed Cup Europe/Africa Zone Group I Play-offs.

References

Lists of Billie Jean King Cup tennis players
Fed
Fed Cup team representatives